The Montgomery County Board of Commissioners is the legislative council and executive arm of Montgomery County, Pennsylvania. Currently, it has 3 different members.

Members of the Board of Commissioners are tasked with managing the county's property and finances, taxation of county residents, managing roads and bridges, appointing department heads and county employees and establishing the  salaries of county employees.

The Chair of the Board of Commissioners is currently held by Kenneth E. Lawrence Jr., a Democrat, since 2023. The Democratic Party holds a 2–1 majority over the Republican Party on the board.

Members
There are three members of the Board of Commissioners, who are elected to serve four-year terms. If there is a vacancy, the County Judges may appoint a replacement.

References 

County governing bodies in the United States
County government agencies in Pennsylvania
Montgomery County, Pennsylvania
Government of Pennsylvania